Luca Sacchi (born 10 January 1968) is a TV commentator and retired Italian swimmer. He competed at the 1988, 1992 and 1996 Olympics in the 200 m and 400 m individual medley and won a bronze medal in the 400 m in 1992. In 1991 he became European champion in the same event.

Sacchi's parents Remo and Bianca are also retired competitive swimmers, and his uncle Massimo and aunt Mara competed in swimming at the 1968 Olympics.

Sacchi currently works as TV commentator for Italian state TV RAI.

References

1968 births
Living people
Swimmers from Milan
Italian male swimmers
Olympic swimmers of Italy
Swimmers at the 1988 Summer Olympics
Swimmers at the 1992 Summer Olympics
Swimmers at the 1996 Summer Olympics
Olympic bronze medalists for Italy
World record setters in swimming
Olympic bronze medalists in swimming
European Aquatics Championships medalists in swimming
European champions for Italy
Medalists at the 1992 Summer Olympics
Mediterranean Games gold medalists for Italy
Swimmers at the 1991 Mediterranean Games
Swimmers at the 1993 Mediterranean Games
Mediterranean Games medalists in swimming
Swimmers of Centro Sportivo Carabinieri